Come Sunday is a studio album of Christian hymns and spirituals by the jazz double bassist Charlie Haden and the pianist Hank Jones. It was recorded only a few months before Jones's death in May 2010. It was Haden and Jones's second album in this vein since 1994's Steal Away. Come Sunday peaked at number 4 on the Billboard Top Jazz Albums chart, 10 on the Billboard Top Christian Albums Chart and at 6 on Billboard Top Gospel Albums Chart.

Reception
The album was positively reviewed by Thom Jurek at Allmusic who wrote that "Ultimately, Come Sunday might have fared a little better by replacing the carols with more hymns, because the former are so staid. But that's a small complaint. At its best, Come Sunday is lovely, elegant, and even stirring." Jurek also critiqued the quality of recording writing that its predecessor Steal Away writing that "...digital recording has been vastly improved upon since the 1990s. On Steal Away some of the warmth afforded a duo like this naturally was blunted because any sense of real depth was virtually unable to be captured on tape, reducing the sense of intimacy. On Come Sunday, it looms large; the studio room itself becomes an equal participant in these sessions – it reflects back everything, from the sounds of piano pedals and fingers on keys to bass strings being pulled and plucked. This is a huge plus; that spaciousness allows the listener to get front-pew close and hear the natural warmth in the playing."

Mark F. Turner reviewed Come Sunday for All About Jazz and wrote that the album "...serves as a reminder of his [Jones's] lyrical touch, accompanied here by Haden's empathy and resonance. ...At 91, his melodicism and technical abilities continue to astound, whether swinging gracefully on "Down by the Riverside" or gently on "Bringing In The Sheaves," as Haden's workmanship guides with unassuming assurance. The two seemed to be enjoying themselves immensely, keeping the tunes pretty much intact but also illuminating their inner qualities, as the swanky cadence of "Give Me That Old Time Religion" silently echoes the song's sentiment, "It's good enough for me." ...From the duo's unobtrusive interpretations to the way in which the Jones and Haden communicate, the melodies contain a quiet magic whose crowning jewel is found in the beloved title track, written by the great Duke Ellington. It is an apropos sentiment to this moving release".

Track listing 
 "Take My Hand, Precious Lord" (Thomas A. Dorsey) – 4:25
 "God Rest Ye Merry, Gentlemen" (Traditional) – 2:29
 "Down by the Riverside" (Traditional) – 2:58
 "Going Home" (Traditional, based on the Largo of Antonín Dvořák's Symphony No. 9, "The New World") – 4:11
 "Blessed Assurance" (Fanny Crosby, Phoebe P. Knapp, Egbert Van Alstyne) – 2:08
 "It Came Upon the Midnight Clear" (Edmund Hamilton Sears, Richard Storrs Willis) – 2:58
 "Bringing In the Sheaves" (George Minor, Knowles Shaw) – 2:53
 "Deep River" (Traditional) – 1:56
 "Give Me That Old Time Religion" (Traditional) – 2:59
 "Sweet Hour of Prayer" (William B. Bradbury, William W. Walford) – 2:29
 "The Old Rugged Cross" (George Bennard) – 3:56
 "Were You There When They Crucified My Lord?" (Traditional) – 3:08
 "Nearer My God to Thee" (Sarah Flower Adams) – 2:16
 "Come Sunday" (Duke Ellington) – 3:29

Personnel 
 Charlie Haden – double bass, arranger, producer
 Hank Jones – piano, arranger

Production
 Jean-Philippe Allard – a&r, executive producer
 Matt Read – art direction
 Tom Gloady, Ted Tuthill – assistant engineer
 Spencer Zahn 	Assistant
 Patrice Beauséjour – cover art
 Anna Kendler – design
 Jay Newland – engineer, mixing
 Maurice Jackson – liner notes
 Mark Wilder – mastering
 Ruth Cameron – photography, producer
 Cheung Ching Ming – photography
 Francesca Hughes – preparation for release
 Farida Bachir – production manager
 Joe D'Ambrosio – project coordinator
 Wulf Müller – project supervisor

References 

2012 albums
Charlie Haden albums
Hank Jones albums
EmArcy Records albums
Instrumental duet albums
Gospel albums by American artists